Justa Grata Honoria was a granddaughter of the Western Roman Emperor Theodosius I.

Honoria may also refer to:

Places
 Honoria District, Puerto Inca, Peru
 236 Honoria, main belt asteroid

People and fictional characters
 Honoria Acosta-Sison (1888–1970), Filipina doctor
 Honoria Conway (1815–1892), one of the founders of the Sisters of Charity of the Immaculate Conception Catholic order
 Honoria Somerville Keer (1883–1969), British surgeon during World War I
 Honoria Winchester, sister of Charles Emerson Winchester III on the TV series M*A*S*H
 Honoria Glossop, a fictional character in the Jeeves stories by P. G. Wodehouse
 the title character of Honoria and Mammon, a 1659 stage play

See also
 Honorias, late Roman province of Asia Minor